Reggie Davis (born November 22, 1995) is an American football wide receiver for the New Orleans Breakers of the United States Football League (USFL). He played college football at Georgia. He signed with the Atlanta Falcons as an undrafted free agent in 2017. He was also a member of the Cleveland Browns, Philadelphia Eagles, Dallas Cowboys, and Chicago Bears.

Professional career

Atlanta Falcons
Davis signed with the Atlanta Falcons as an undrafted free agent on May 14, 2017. He was waived by the team on September 2, 2017.

Cleveland Browns
On September 3, 2017, Davis was claimed off waivers by the Cleveland Browns. He was waived by the Browns on September 22, 2017.

Atlanta Falcons (second stint)
On September 26, 2017, Davis was signed to the Falcons' practice squad. He signed a reserve/future contract with the Falcons on January 15, 2018.

On September 1, 2018, Davis was waived by the Falcons.

Philadelphia Eagles
On September 10, 2018, Davis was signed to the Philadelphia Eagles' practice squad. He was released on September 20.

Dallas Cowboys
On November 1, 2018, Davis was signed to the Dallas Cowboys practice squad. He was re-signed on February 7, 2019. He was released on August 31, 2019.

Chicago Bears
On December 11, 2019, Davis joined the Chicago Bears' practice squad. He had worked out with the team in September 2018 after receiver Anthony Miller suffered an injury, but was not signed. On December 30, 2019, Davis was signed to a reserve/future contract.

Davis was waived by the team on September 5, 2020, as part of final roster cuts, and re-signed to the practice squad a day later. He was placed on the practice squad/injured list on December 23, 2020. On January 15, 2021, Davis signed a reserve/futures contract with the Bears. He was waived on May 17, 2021.

Dallas Cowboys (second stint)
On June 11, 2021, Davis signed with the Dallas Cowboys. He was waived on August 31, 2021.

New Orleans Breakers
Davis signed with the New Orleans Breakers of the USFL on January 14, 2023.

References

External links
247 Sports bio

1995 births
Living people
Players of American football from Tallahassee, Florida
American football wide receivers
Georgia Bulldogs football players
Atlanta Falcons players
Cleveland Browns players
Philadelphia Eagles players
Dallas Cowboys players
Chicago Bears players
New Orleans Breakers (2022) players